Lucy-Ann Adams McFadden (born 1953) is an American astronomer and planetary scientist. An employee of NASA, she also founded the Science, Discovery & the Universe Program within the University of Maryland, and the Explore-It-All Science Center, a children's science program.

Biography 
McFadden was born in New York City in 1952. Her studies culminated in a bachelor's degree from Hampshire College (1974), Master's in earth and planetary science from Massachusetts Institute of Technology  (1977), and a Ph.D. in geology and geophysics from the University of Hawaii (1983) with the dissertation Spectral reflectance of near-Earth asteroids : implications for composition, origin and evolution. She has held positions at the University of Maryland, College Park, California Space Institute at the University of California, San Diego, and Space Telescope Science Institute. At NASA, McFadden has been an investigator for the Dawn mission to 4 Vesta and Ceres; and the Deep Impact and EPOXI programs. She has been a science team member for Near Earth Asteroid Rendezvous mission; a member of the 2007-2008 ANSMET expedition; a member of the Almahata Sitta meteorite expedition (Northern Sudan, 2009); a leader of the NASA Goddard higher education and university programs (2010); and director of the Education and Public Outreach program for the Deep Impact and Dawn missions.

Selected works 
 1977, Visible Spectral Reflectance Measurements of the Galilean Satellites of Jupiter (MORE)
 1999, Encyclopedia of the solar system (with Paul Robert Weissman; T V Johnson)

Awards and honors 
 2015 – AAAS Fellow in Astronomy 
 2012 – NASA Group Achievement Award Dawn Vesta Operations Team
 2011 – NASA Group Achievement Award EPOXI Science Team
 2009 – National Science Foundation Antarctica Science Service Medal
 2009 – NASA Group Achievement Award EPOXI Project Team
 2009 – NASA Group Achievement Award Dawn Science Operations Team,
 2005 – Space Frontier Foundation Vision to Reality Award- Deep Impact Team
 2005 – Geological Society of Washington, Best Presentation Award
 1987 – asteroid 3066 McFadden named in her honor

References

Bibliography

External links 
 Lucy A. McFadden, University of Maryland

American science writers
1952 births
Living people
American women astronomers
Women science writers
NASA astrophysicists
University of California, San Diego faculty
University of Maryland, College Park faculty
Hampshire College alumni
Massachusetts Institute of Technology School of Science alumni
University of Hawaiʻi alumni
Scientists from New York City
20th-century American  astronomers
21st-century American  astronomers
20th-century American women scientists
21st-century American women scientists
American women non-fiction writers
20th-century American women writers
21st-century American women writers
Women planetary scientists
Planetary scientists
American founders
Women founders